Austfjorden may refer to:

Austfjorden (Vestland), a fjord in Alver and Masfjorden municipalities in Vestland county, Norway
Austfjorden (Svalbard), a fjord in Svalbard, Norway

See also
Austefjorden, a fjord in Volda municipality, Møre og Romsdal county, Norway